Sayed Khatiboleslam Sadrnezhaad is an Iranian distinguished professor of materials science and engineering, at the Sharif University of Technology. He received his Ph.D. from the Massachusetts Institute of Technology in 1979 and his B.Sc. from the Sharif University of Technology in 1974. He was entitled as 1% world's top scientists by the ESI citation database from Thomson Reuters 2015 and 2016. He is the holder of a research chair from the Iran National Science Foundation (INSF). His current interest is in the emerging bio-nano and SMA fields of the materials science and engineering discipline.

Early life and education
S.K. Sadrnezhaad was born and raised in Tehran. He earned his bachelor’s degree with distinction (first rank) from the Sharif (Aryamehr), the University of Technology, in July 1974. Then he attended the materials science and engineering department of the Massachusetts Institute of Technology, where he received a Ph.D. in February 1979. He conducted his Ph.D. thesis work under John Frank Elliot's direction to determine the DRI pellets' melting rate in steelmaking slags. Following this, he spent six months as a postdoc fellow under the supervision of John Frank Elliot at the same department to study the specification of the sulfur-containing emissions from the coal combustion and metallurgical plants and another six months as Jefe de Ingenieria Metallurgica in HYL Tecnologia of Monterrey, NL, Mexico  (1979–1980).

Education
 PhD, Department of Materials Science and Engineering, Massachusetts Institute of Technology, MA, United States
 BSc, (July 1974), Department of Metallurgical Engineering, Sharif (Aryamehr) University of Technology, Tehran, Iran

Academic positions
 Professor, Department of Materials Science and Engineering, Sharif University of Technology (1997–Present) Tehran, Iran
 Associate professor, Dept. of Mater. Sc. & Eng., Sharif University of Technology (1986–1997) Tehran, Iran
 Assistant professor, Dept. of Mater. Sc. & Eng., Isfahan & Sharif University of Technology (1980–1986) Tehran, Iran
 Visiting scientist, Massachusetts Institute of Technology (1989–1991) MA, United States
 Postdoctoral associate, Massachusetts Institute of Technology (1979) MA, United States

Research interests
 Bionanomaterials, Production, Characterization, and Medical Application
 Nanomaterials: Production and Characterization
 Memory Alloys: Ti-Ni, Cu-Zn-Al, Cu-Ni-Al
 Precious Metals: Recovery from Industrial Scraps
 Extraction of Rhenium, Molybdenum, Vanadium, Nickel, Magnesium and Manganese
 Environmental Control: Metallurgical Industries
 Direct Smelting, Steelmaking and Nodular Cast Iron Production with DRI
 Microalloying of Steel with V, Nb and Ti
 Dephosphorization and Desulfurization of Steel
 Sulfur Emissions from Coal Combustion and Pyrometallurgical Furnaces
 Vaporization of Residual Elements from Nonferrous Mattes and Slimes
 Kinetics of Leaching of Molybdenum Oxide and Sulfide Concentrates
 SX, Ion Exchange and Active Carbon Methods

Honors and distinctions
 Kharazmi’s National Research Prize (1988) 1367, Tehran, Iran
 Tehran University Academic Book Prize (1993) 1372, Tehran, Iran
 Annual National Book Prize (1995) 1373, Tehran, Iran
 Distinguished Professor (1997) 1375, Sharif University of Technology
 Kharazmi’s Selected Research Project (1998) 1376, Tehran, Iran
 National Selected Book Prize (2001) 1379, Tehran, Iran
 Distinguished Researcher (2002) 1380, Sharif University of Technology
 Tehran University Academic Book Prize (2002) 1381, Tehran, Iran
 World Energy Council and National Energy Committee Authorship Prize (2003) 1382, Tehran, Iran
 Distinguished Researcher (2007) 1386, Sharif University of Technology
 National Distinguished Professor of 1386, Ministry of Science, Research and Technology (2008) Tehran, Iran
 Seventh Rank in Annual Nano Research Prize of 1391 (2012) Tehran, Iran
 Sixth Rank in Annual Nano Research Prize of 1390 (2011) Tehran, Iran
 Forth Rank in Annual Nano Research Prize of 1388 (2009) Tehran, Iran

Editorial positions
 Editor-in-chief, International Journal of Engineering (IJE) (1987–2011) Tehran, Iran
 Editor-in-chief, Iranian Journal of Biomedical Engineering (2005–2009) Tehran, Iran
 Editor-in-chief, Journal of Engineering Materials (2008–present) Tehran, Iran
 Member of editorial board, Engineering Journal of Ferdowsi University of Mashhad (1997–2001) Mashhad, Iran
 Member of editorial board, Materials Science and Engineering Journal of Iran University of Sc. & Tech. (2004–present) Tehran, Iran

Administrative positions
 Director, Materials and Energy Research Center (2006–2010) Tehran, Iran
 Chancellor, Sharif University of Technology (1995–1997) Tehran, Iran
 Chancellor, Tarbiat Modares University (1987–1988) Tehran, Iran
 Chancellor, Sadra Institute of Higher Education (2002–2004) Tehran, Iran
 Research deputy of Ministry of Culture and Higher Education (1985–1987) Tehran, Iran
 Vice chancellor of publication affairs, Sharif University of Technology (1988–1989) Tehran, Iran
 Dean of graduate studies, Sharif University of Technology (1993–1995) Tehran, Iran
 Chairman of Medical Engineering Group, Janbazan Bioengineering Research Center (1992–1995) Tehran, Iran
 Chairman of Materials Engineering Department, Tarbiat Modarres University (1984–1988) Tehran, Iran
 Chairman of Technical and Engineering Group, Cultural Revolution Headquarters (1982–1984) Tehran, Iran
 Chairman of Materials Committee, Technical and Engineering Group, Cultural Revolution Headquarters (1981–1985) Tehran, Iran

Subjects instructed
 Thermodynamics of Nanomaterials
 Smart Materials and Memory Alloys
 Thermodynamics of Materials
 Kinetic Processes in Materials Systems
 Process System Analysis and Control
 Transport Phenomena in Materials Systems
 Extractive Metallurgy of Iron and Steel Physical Chemistry of Materials
 Fuel and Energy Direct Reduction of Iron
 Steelmaking
 Secondary Metallurgy
 Solidification Processing
 Physics of Heat
 Biomedical Application of Metals

Industrial positions
 Jefe de Ingenieria Metallurgica, HYL Tecnologia, Monterray (1979–1980) NL, Mexico
 Head of Metall. Eng., Industrial Development and Independence Headquarters, Ministry of Industry (1980–1981) Tehran, Iran

References

External links
 Official Website

MIT School of Engineering alumni
Academic staff of Sharif University of Technology
People from Tehran
Living people
1951 births
Chancellors of the Sharif University of Technology